Lindauer Brothers Company was a Chicago dealer in men's goods that went bankrupt in 1888.

References

Further reading
New York Times; November 18, 1888; Chicago, November 17, 1888. "The banks of this city, as a whole, will suffer a good deal of a loss by the failure yesterday of Lindauer Brothers Co., manufacturers of men's furnishing goods."
New York Times; November 19, 1888; Chicago,  November 18, 1888. "That the assets of Lindauer Brothers Co. will even approximate in value the amount of the firm's indebtedness is denied by Kraus, Mayer Stein, the attorneys for a long list of creditors."

Bankrupt companies of the United States
History of Chicago